Reda Doumaz (born 1956 in Algiers) is an important figure of the chaâbi music in Algeria, known for his interpretation of hizia and moulet el ain elzarqa (en-tr:the blue eyed lady). He was born and raised in the Casbah of Algiers.

Biography 
He grew up in a musical family in a working-class neighborhood, where partying was part of the culture. Although passionate about music, he chose to concentrate first on his studies, at the end of which he applied for an executive position in a national company.

He sings about the youth of his country, the working-class neighborhoods of Algiers and the impossible loves; timeless themes that resound and echo with his many many listeners.

Discography 
 El Attlal (Vestiges)

Notes and references 

1956 births
People from Casbah
Algerian composers
Living people
21st-century Algerian people